The 1927–28 Michigan Wolverines men's basketball team represented the University of Michigan in intercollegiate basketball during the 1927–28 season.  The team played its home games at Yost Field House on the school's campus in Ann Arbor, Michigan.  The team finished fifth in the Western Conference. This was E. J. Mather's final season as head coach.  Frank Harrigan served as team captain and the second highest scorer with 104 points in 17 games.  Bennie Oosterbaan was the Western Conference scoring champion with 129 points in conference games.  Oosterbaan had 172 points in 16 overall games, an average of 10.8 points per game, and was selected as a first-team 1928 All-American in basketball.

Schedule

Scoring statistics

References

Michigan
Michigan Wolverines men's basketball seasons
Michigan Wolverines basketball
Michigan Wolverines basketball